Kratul was an Illyrian settlement and fortification located in the territories of the Illyrian tribe of Labeates. The archaeological material indicates that life at the settlement was active from the early Iron Age (beginning of 1st millennium BC) until the 1st century AD. In the modern era it is the name of a city situated in Albania, north of Boks.

Fortification 

Kratul fortification represents a good example that sheds light on the typology of military architecture among Illyrians. The fortification wall encloses an elliptical shape area (which is uncommon among other fortifications but adopts well to the terrain) and covers about 0.5 ha. The wall was built using large blocks on both curtains, while the core is filled with smaller stones. The blocks are unworked and no mortar has been used. The walls' width  goes up to 3.35 m while the height is 2.55 m.
Three gates which served for communication have been identified. Two of them are across each other respectively on the north and south side, while the third one is on the east side. From a typological point of view the Kratul fortification is similar to that of Gajtan, although there are substantial changes in plan such as towers and the regular elliptic shape, which make it an interesting site. So far, there have been no trace of houses found inside the settlement.

Location 

They lie over the nowadays village of Boks, part of the municipal unit of Postribë in Shkodër County. On the plain south of the village's outskirts, near the left banks of Kir river, are located 160 tumuli of Shtoj, which date back to the early Bronze Age.

See also 
 List of settlements in Illyria

References

Bibliography 

Cities in ancient Illyria
Illyrian Albania
Former populated places in the Balkans
Illyrian architecture
Archaeological sites in Albania
Buildings and structures in Shkodër County
Fortifications in Albania
Archaeology of Illyria